The Lohmann Brown is a variety of chicken, raised specifically for egg-laying productivity. It is of crossbreed origin, selectively bred from lines of Rhode Island breed and White Rock breeds. They start to lay at about 19 weeks, producing up to 320 eggs to an age of 72 weeks (one year production). Eggs are laid nearly daily, normally during the morning time.

Most Lohmann Browns have a caramel/brown shade of feathers, with white feathers in a pattern round their necks, and white feathers at the tips of their tail feathers.

References

Chicken crossbreeds